Euplecta is a genus of air-breathing land snails, terrestrial pulmonate gastropod molluscs in the family Ariophantidae.

These snails are restricted to South India and Sri Lanka.

More than eighty species are recognized according to the World Register of Marine Species (WoRMS).

Species
 Euplecta acalles (Pfeiffer, 1857)
 Euplecta acuducta (Benson, 1850)
 Euplecta albizonata (Dohrn, 1858)
 Euplecta apicata (Blanford, 1870)
 Euplecta baconi (Benson, 1850)
 Euplecta binoyaensis Godwin-Austen, 1899
 Euplecta cacuminifera (Benson, 1850)
 Euplecta colletti (E.R. Sykes, 1897)
 Euplecta concavospira (L. Pfeiffer, 1854)
 Euplecta eastlakeana (O.F. von Möllendorff, 1883)
 Euplecta emiliana (L. Pfeiffer, 1852)
 Euplecta fluctuosa Blanford, 1901
 Euplecta foveolata Preston, 1909
 Euplecta gardneri (L. Pfeiffer, 1846)
 Euplecta granulifera Blanford, 1901
 Euplecta herosae Thach & F. Huber, 2018: synonym of Trichochloritis fouresi (Morlet, 1886) (junior synonym)
 Euplecta huberi Thach, 2018: synonym of Ganesella emma (L. Pfeiffer, 1863) (junior synonym)
 Euplecta hueae Thach & F. Huber, 2018: synonym of Ganesella rostrella (L. Pfeiffer, 1863) (junior synonym)
 Euplecta hyphasma (L. Pfeiffer, 1853)
 Euplecta imperforata Schepman, 1918
 Euplecta indica (L. Pfeiffer, 1846)
 Euplecta isabellina (L. Pfeiffer, 1854)
 Euplecta laevis W.T. Blanford, 1901
 Euplecta lankaensis H.B. Preston, 1909
 Euplecta layardi (L. Pfeiffer, 1851)
 Euplecta mucosa (W. T. Blanford & H. F. Blanford, 1861)
 Euplecta mucronifera Blanford, 1901
 Euplecta neglecta (L. Pfeiffer, 1854)
 Euplecta oribates Blanford, 1901
 Euplecta partita (L. Pfeiffer, 1854)
 Euplecta phidias (S.C.T. Hanley & W. Theobald, 1876)
 Euplecta pingoungensis Godwin-Austen, 1888
 Euplecta prestoni (H.H. Godwin-Austen, 1897)
 Euplecta pulchella Blanford, 1905
 Euplecta rosamonda (W.H. Benson, 1860)
 Euplecta schneideriana I. Rensch, 1930
 Euplecta scobinoides E.R. Sykes, 1897
 Euplecta semidecussata (L. Pfeiffer, 1853)
 Euplecta subcastor (Beddome, 1891)
 Euplecta subdecussata (Pfeiffer, 1857)
 Euplecta subopaca (L. Pfeiffer, 1853)
 Euplecta travancorica (Benson, 1865)
 Euplecta trimeni (F.P. Jousseaume, 1894)
 Euplecta tripilaris (Gredler, 1890)
 Euplecta turritella (C.B. Adams, 1869)
 Euplecta verrucula (L. Pfeiffer, 1855)

However, Worldwide Mollusc Species Database described (WMSD)

 Euplecta adulta (A.R.J.B. Bavay, 1908)
 Euplecta aylvaus W.L.H. Dohrn
 Euplecta biserialis Unknown
Euplecta divisa (E. Forbes, 1851)
 Euplecta haematina (O.F. von Möllendorff)
 Euplecta inclinata (L. Pfeiffer, 1864)
 Euplecta juvenis (E.A. Smith)
 Euplecta minor (C. Hedley, 1891)
 Euplecta rathouisii (P.M. Heude, 1880)
 Euplecta rosseliana (E.A. Smith, 1889)
 Euplecta woodlarkensis (C. Hedley, 1891)

References

 Bank, R. A. (2017). Classification of the Recent terrestrial Gastropoda of the World. Last update: July 16, 2017

External links

 Semper, C. (1870-1885). Reisen im Archipel der Philippinen, Theil 2. Wissenschaftliche Resultate. Band 3, Landmollusken. Wiesbaden: Kreidel. [1-80, pls 1-7 (1870); 81-128 (1873); 129-168 (1874); 169-224 (1877); 225-264, pls 19–20, 22–23 (1880); 265–290, pl. 21 (1882); 291-327, pls 24–27 (1885)] (publication dates after Zool. Record)

 
Gastropod genera